Nikolay Vasilievich Trusov (born 2 July 1985, in Leningrad) is a Russian professional racing cyclist, who last rode for UCI Continental team . Trusov has been a professional since 2004.

Major results 

 2005
 2004–2005 Track Cycling World Cup
3rd Team Pursuit, Moscow (with Serguei Klimov, Anton Mindlin and Alexander Serov)
3rd Madison, Los Angeles (with Mikhail Ignatiev)
 1st Clásica Memorial Txuma
 2005–2006 Track Cycling World Cup
2nd Team Pursuit, Moscow (with Serguei Klimov, Anton Mindlin and Alexander Serov)
1st Madison, Moscow (with Mikhail Ignatiev)
2nd Madison, Manchester (with Mikhail Ignatiev)
 2006
 2005–2006 Track Cycling World Cup
1st Team Pursuit, Los Angeles (with Sergei Klimov, Ivan Rovny and Alexander Serov)
3rd Madison, Los Angeles (with Mikhail Ignatiev)
 1st Stage 1 Cinturón a Mallorca
 Five Rings of Moscow
1st Prologue, Stages 1, 2, 3 & 5
 1st Stage 5 Volta a Lleida
 2006–2007 Track Cycling World Cup
1st Team Pursuit, Sydney (with Mikhail Ignatiev, Ivan Rovny and Alexander Serov)
1st Madison, Sydney (with Mikhail Ignatiev)
2nd Team Pursuit, Moscow (with Ivan Kovalev, Alexander Serov and Ivan Rovny)
 2007
 2006–2007 Track Cycling World Cup
2nd Team Pursuit, Manchester (with Alexei Bauer, Evgeny Kovalev and Ivan Kovalev)
3rd Madison, Manchester (with Serguei Klimov)
 2nd Eindhoven Team Time Trial (Tinkoff Credit Systems, with Sergei Klimov, Ivan Rovny, Mikhail Ignatiev, Yevgeni Petrov, Pavel Brutt and Vasil Kiryienka)
 1st Stage 2 Tour of Britain
 2009
 1st Stage 5 Volta a Catalunya
 1st Duo Normand (with Artem Ovechkin)
 2012
 6th Overall Ster ZLM Toer
2013
 8th Overall Volta ao Alentejo
 9th Riga–Jūrmala GP
2015
 2nd Kampioenschap van Vlaanderen
2016
 1st Stage 5 (TTT) Tour of Croatia
 9th Overall Tour des Fjords
2018
 1st  Sprints classification Abu Dhabi Tour

References

External links 

Cyclists from Saint Petersburg
Russian male cyclists
1985 births
Living people
Olympic cyclists of Russia
Cyclists at the 2008 Summer Olympics
Russian track cyclists